Joseph Whitehead (October 31, 1867 – July 8, 1938) was a United States Representative from Virginia, serving from 1925 to 1931.

Biography
Whitehead was born near Mount Airy, Pittsylvania County, Va., October 31, 1867. He attended the public schools of his native city and graduated from the academic department of Richmond College (now the University of Richmond), Richmond, Va., in 1889, then from the law department of the University of Virginia at Charlottesville in 1892. He was admitted to the bar the same year and commenced the practice of law in Chatham, Virginia. He became law partners with Claude A. Swanson.

From 1899-1904 he served in the State senate, representing Pittsylvania County and the City of Danville. He was elected as a Democrat to the Sixty-ninth, Seventieth, and Seventy-first Congresses (March 4, 1925 – March 3, 1931), then was an unsuccessful candidate for renomination in 1930. He resumed the practice of his chosen profession until his death at Danville Memorial Hospital in Danville, Va., on July 22, 1938, he was interred in Chatham Cemetery.

Electoral history

1924; Whitehead was elected to the U.S. House of Representatives with 75.96% of the vote, defeating Republican G.A. DeHart.
1926; Whitehead was re-elected unopposed.
1928; Whitehead was re-elected with 54.27% of the vote, defeating Republican Taylor G. Vaughan and Independent Cabell Staples.

Sources
 

1867 births
1938 deaths
Virginia lawyers
Democratic Party members of the United States House of Representatives from Virginia
20th-century American politicians
19th-century American lawyers
People from Pittsylvania County, Virginia